Tribune Channel is a channel or strait on the Central Coast of British Columbia, Canada, separating Gilford Island on the west and north from the mainland.  The channel bends around Gilford Island, with the mouth of Thompson Sound at the elbow of the bend, opening eastwards to the mouth of the Kakweiken River.  

At its southern end, it opens onto lower Knight Inlet.

 Tribune Bay Provincial Park and bay of the same name, on the east coast of Hornby Island.
 Tribune Point, on the south side of Gilford Island.
 Tribune Rock, in the Queen Charlotte Strait region to the north of Hurst Island.

References

Straits of British Columbia
Central Coast of British Columbia